V500 Aquilae also known as Nova Aquilae 1943 was a nova which appeared in the constellation Aquila, very near the star Altair, in 1943.   It was discovered by Cuno Hoffmeister on photographic plates taken at Sonneberg Observatory on 5 September 1943, when it had a photographic magnitude of 12.  It reached its peak brightness sometime between 13 April 1943 when it was fainter than photographic magnitude 13.5, and 2 May 1943 when its photographic magnitude was 6.55 (6.1 visual magnitude).

V500 Aquilae's brightness dropped by 3 magnitudes from its peak in 42 days, making it a "fast" nova.

All novae are binary stars, with a "donor" star orbiting a white dwarf. The two stars are so close to each other that matter is transferred from the donor to the white dwarf. Because the stars are separated by a distance comparable to the radius of the donor star, novae are often eclipsing binaries, and V500 Aquilae does show eclipses.

In 1984 a small (radius 2.0 arc second) nova remnant surrounding V500 Aquilae and expanding at 1380 km/sec, was discovered using the Hale Telescope. The expansion of that remnant has been used to derive a distance estimate of 4900 parsecs.

References

External links
 www.tsm.toyama.toyama.jp
 V0500 Aql
 GCVS V0500 Aql
 V0500 Aql
 Image V500 Aquilae
 Simbad

Novae
Aquila (constellation)
1943 in science
Aquilae, V500